The Alfa Romeo 183T was a Formula One car designed by Gérard Ducarouge and Mario Tollentino and was used by Marlboro Team Alfa Romeo during the 1983 Formula One season. The car, with a newly designed flat bottom,  made its debut at the 1983 Brazilian Grand Prix. Running on Michelin tyres, the 183T was driven in 1983 by Italian drivers Andrea de Cesaris and Mauro Baldi.

Design and development
Unlike the preceding Alfa Romeo F1 cars, the 183T chassis was not designed by Alfa Romeo's Autodelta; instead Euroracing's chief engineer Gérard Ducarouge was the main designer (Ducarouge was fired by Alfa less than a month into the 1983 season and was quickly signed by Lotus). Euroracing had been earlier successful in Formula 3 with Alfa Romeo engines.

The 183T was basically an updated version of the teams  car, the 182. Gone however was Alfa's 1260 V12 which had served the team since . In its place was the 890T, a 1.5-liter turbocharged V8 engine (the 1260 engine was still used at the time by the Osella team). The change in engine gave the 183T a significant boost in power. However, this still fell short of the  power figures quoted for the turbocharged BMW, Renault and Ferrari engines. During the year the 890T's fuel consumption wasn't a factor as stops for fuel were permitted. From , however, when the FIA imposed a 220-liter fuel limit on the cars and banned stops for fuel, the V8 engine's fuel consumption, plus its shortage of power would see Alfa wane as a Formula One front runner.

Racing history
The 183T took 18 points from 29 entries. Andrea de Cesaris managed to score two second-place finishes and also gained one fastest lap at Spa Francorchamps, a race that he started from the 2nd row and led over half of the distance.

The 183T was used in early season testing before the  season, fitted with new sidepods that would later appear on its successor, the Alfa Romeo 184T. However, the 183T was retired before the start of the season and was not further used in competition.

Complete Formula One results
(key) (results in italics indicate fastest lap)

References

183T
1983 Formula One season cars